The Marampa mine is a large iron mine located in central Sierra Leone in the Northern Province. Marampa represents one of the largest iron ore reserves in Sierra Leone and in the world having estimated reserves of 1 billion tonnes of ore grading 32% iron metal.

References 

Iron mines in Sierra Leone
2012 establishments in Sierra Leone